Tamibarotene (brand name: Amnolake), also called retinobenzoic acid, is orally active, synthetic retinoid, developed to overcome all-trans retinoic acid (ATRA) resistance, with potential antineoplastic activity against acute promyelocytic leukaemia (APL) . It is currently marketed only in Japan and early trials have demonstrated that it tends to be better tolerated than ATRA. It has also been investigated as a possible treatment for Alzheimer's disease, multiple myeloma and Crohn's disease. Tamibarotene is found to have inhibitory potential for the viral spike protein of Omicron variant of SARS-CoV2 and can be a potential candidate for developing potential therapeutics for the treatment of omicron variant of COVID19.

Synthesis

The tetralin-based compound tamibarotene (7) has been tested as an agent for treating leukaemias.

Reaction of the
diol (1) with hydrogen chloride affords the corresponding dichloro derivative (2). Aluminum chloride mediated Friedel–Crafts alkylation of acetanilide with the dichloride affords the tetralin (3). Basic hydrolysis leads to the primary amine (4). Acylation of the primary amino group with the half acid chloride half ester from terephthalic acid (5) leads to
the amide (6). Basic hydrolysis of the ester grouping then affords (7).

References 

Retinoids
Antineoplastic drugs
Benzoic acids
Tetralins
SRI International